Morosini is an Italian surname. Notable people with the surname include:

Morosini family
Piermario Morosini (1986–2012), Italian footballer
 Sergio Rossetti Morosini (1953– ), New York author, painter, sculptor and independent filmmaker, has recently sculpted the bust of Michelangelo on the façade of the National Arts Club in New York. First to observe that in 1511, Titian described the volume in a two-dimensional fresco painting, Miracle of the Jealous Husband, in the it:Scuola del Santo, Padua, Italy, by actually sculpting it in relief rather than describing it illusionistically.

Italian-language surnames